Angels Cry or Angel's Cry may refer to:

 Angels Cry (album), an album by Angra, or the title song
 "Angels Cry" (song), a song by Mariah Carey
 "Angels Cry", a song by Everlife from Everlife (2004)
 Angel's Cry, an album by Geasa
 Angel's Cry, a film by Pierre Roland
 The Angels Cry, a song written by Justin Hayward and released separately by Agnetha Fältskog and Annie Haslam in 1985